Polideportivo Carlos Martinez Balmori is a 6,000-seat indoor arena located in Mineral de la Reforma, Mexico.  It was built in 2001.  It is home to the Universidad Autonoma del Estado de Hidalgo basketball and volleyball teams.

The arena contains 12 luxury suites.  4 dressing rooms for teams, 2 dressing rooms for referees, and a climbing wall, among other amenities.  It is also used for other events such as concerts, lucha libre, graduation ceremonies, other sporting events, and other special events.

External links
Pagina oficial

Indoor arenas in Mexico
Sports venues in Hidalgo (state)
Volleyball venues in Mexico
Basketball venues in Mexico